The 1961–62 Irish Cup was the 82nd edition of the premier knock-out cup competition in Northern Irish football. 

Linfield won the cup for the 28th time, defeating Portadown 4–0 in the final at The Oval. 

The holders Glenavon were defeated by Portadown in the semi-finals.

Results

First round

|}

Replay

|}

Quarter-finals

|}

Replay

|}

Semi-finals

|}

Final

References

External links
The Rec.Sport.Soccer Statistics Foundation - Northern Ireland - Cup Finals

Irish Cup seasons
1961–62 in Northern Ireland association football
1961–62 domestic association football cups